Poziv Tour was an eighth concert tour by Serbian singer Ceca, in support of her fifteenth studio album Poziv (2013). It began on 28 June 2013, in Belgrade, Serbia, at the Ušće and concluded on 7 May 2016, in Thessaloniki, Greece at the Fix live. During the tour she held the biggest concert of her career. The concert in Belgrade was attended by more than 150,000 people.

Set list 

 Nevaljala
 Lepi grome moj
 Beograd
 Idi dok si mlad
 Zaboravi
 Neodoljiv-neumoljiv
 Pet minuta
 Doktor
 Vazduh koji dišem
 Brat
 Nagovori
 Ime i prezime
 Da raskinem sa njom
 Kad bi bio ranjen
 Žuto pile
 Poziv
 Lepotan
 Volela sam, volela
 Turbulentno
 Pazi s kime spavaš
 Votka sa utehom
 Maskarada
 Dobro sam prošla
 Sve što imam i nemam

Tour dates

Box office score data

References

2013 concert tours
2014 concert tours
2015 concert tours
2016 concert tours